Graham Greene, CM (born June 22, 1952) is an Indigenous Canadian actor who has worked on stage, in film, and in TV productions in Canada, the United Kingdom, and the United States. He has achieved international fame for participating in Kevin Costner's Dances with Wolves (1990), which earned him an Academy Award nomination. Other notable films include Thunderheart (1992), Maverick (1994), Die Hard with a Vengeance (1995), The Green Mile (1999), Skins (2002), Transamerica (2005), Casino Jack (2010), Winter's Tale (2014), The Shack (2017), Wind River (2017) and Shadow Wolves (2019).

Early life and career
Greene is an Oneida born in Ohsweken, on the Six Nations Reserve in Ontario, the son of Lillian and John Greene, who was a paramedic and maintenance man. He lived in Hamilton, Ontario, as a young man. Before moving into acting, he worked as a draftsman, steelworker and welder. He noted:"...I was a welder because once you put your helmet down and struck the arc...they wouldn't bother you...And there was a fear of getting laid off when the contract runs out. If I'm going to be looking for work, I'd rather be acting".His first brushes with the entertainment industry came when he worked as an audio technician for rock bands based in Newfoundland and Labrador, when he went by the alias "Mabes". According to Greene, musician Kelly Jay repeatedly pestered him to try out for a play. He told Jay, "Look, I’m not interested. We’ll cut cards. If I win, leave me alone. If you win, I’ll do the damn thing." After drawing a two of clubs, he relented. 

A common misconception is that he graduated from the Toronto-based Centre for Indigenous Theatre's Native Theatre School program. As he noted in a 2012 interview, he "helped run it, as executive director of a school-supporting local arts organization". By the 1970s he began performing in professional theatre in Toronto and England and in 1976 he participated in the University of Western Ontario's touring workshop performance of James Reaney's Wacousta.

His television debut was in an episode of The Great Detective in 1979, and his screen debut was in 1983 in Running Brave. On viewing his first television role, Greene stated that it was "awful", and that it prompted him to start learning to act as a profession.

Career

Theatre 
Greene frequently worked at the Native Earth Performing Arts, and is well known for his performance in Dry Lips Oughta Move to Kapuskasing as the affable drunk Pierre St. Pierre. He has also performed in The Crackwalker and History of the Village of the Small Huts.

In 2007, he appeared as Shylock in the Stratford Shakespeare Festival production of The Merchant of Venice as well as Breakfast with Scot.

Television 
In 1984 and 1986, Greene appeared in the First Nations' CBC TV series Spirit Bay as Pete "Baba" Green. The show was one of the first to show aboriginal life and the interactions between the native and white cultures.

In the early 1990s he found guest-star work several television series. As Leonard Quinhagak on Northern Exposure he portrayed a shaman that helped care for the residents. As a practitioner of shamanism, his character came into direct conflict with the show's other doctor, a traditionally trained professional that (initially) had little use for unorthodox ways.  

He was cast as Edgar "K.B." Montrose, an explosives enthusiast, on The Red Green Show. His character was asked what he thought of the movie Dances with Wolves, replying "...the native guy (himself as 'Kicking Bird') was OK. Should have gotten the Oscar. But the rest of it was a yawn!" Greene would portray this character periodically for the entire run of series, from 1994 through 2006. 

In 1992, Greene played the role of Ishi, the last Yahi, in the HBO drama The Last of His Tribe, and in 1994, he began appearing as Mr. Crabby Tree in the children's series The Adventures of Dudley the Dragon. When asked how he landed the role resulting in being ensconced in a foam tree costume, he stated "‘Well, never answer the phone before 9 a.m. I was lounging around the house doing nothing, I told my agent I need some work. I got offered Mr. Crabby Tree, said sure." 

Greene guested on the sketch comedy show Royal Canadian Air Farce in 1994. Between 1997 and 2001 he hosted the reality crime documentary show Exhibit A: Secrets of Forensic Science. 

He starred in the short-lived television series Wolf Lake in 2001 as Sherman Blackstone along Lou Diamond Phillips. In 2002 and 2004, he co-starred in two made-for-TV films that were an attempt at launching a revival of the long-running Canadian series The Beachcombers. He also guest starred in five episodes of Being Erica as Dr. Arthur in 2010-11.

He appeared as himself in a parody of the famous Lakota-brand pain reliever commercials, on CBC Television's Rick Mercer Report.

In 2006, Greene presented the documentary series The War that Made America, about the Seven Years' War (French and Indian War) of the mid–18th century in North America. 

He was a guest star in an episode of the TV series Numb3rs, as a First Nations chief.  

At the urging of actor Lou Diamond Phillips, Greene was cast as a recurring guest star on Longmire, which ran for six seasons from 2012 to 2017 on A&E and Netflix. As Malachi Strand, Greene was able to enjoy playing a villain, with the actor stating "Playing villains is fun. Being nice all the time; it’s boring".

Movies

Dances with Wolves 
Greene's Academy Award–nominated role as Kicking Bird (Lakota: Ziŋtká Nagwáka) in the 1990 film Dances with Wolves showcased his talents to audiences beyond his native Canada. In an interview with CineMovie, Greene recounts a story of being tossed from a horse during production. When director Costner asked if he wanted a break, the actor retorted that he was more interested in finding the horse for payback. He stated that it was difficult for him to learn how to speak the Lakota language properly. Having not grown up speaking a native language, he said "...‘I couldn’t figure out how they ordered their language. Its structure is totally foreign to English or French." Intensively studying and working with a dialect coach finally succeeded. As noted in a 1994 Playback interview, "Greene struggled to learn the language phonetically, sitting in his hotel room for eight hours a day. He had tapes, and a dialogue coach who was with him and on his case every second. It took him two weeks to learn all the dialogue, 'then I’d work in my hotel room until two in the morning, going through the speeches. Next morning I couldn’t remember any of it! I was nearly in tears!’ He’d go back to the beginning, and slowly, finally it came."The actor stated that he had no troubles with Costner as a director, with one exception:“He did fine,” Greene says. “We stayed out of his way and let him make his decisions. I only questioned him once, [when Kicking Bird] was going nuts looking for a peace pipe. I said, ‘He’s a medicine person. He would never lose a peace pipe. Why do you want me to do that?’ He said, ‘Because it looks good.’ I said, ‘Good enough.’”In that same interview, he stated that being at the Academy Award ceremony was difficult. "I was scared to death. I thought, I don’t belong here! I’m just a poor, dumb country boy.", and he was particularly intimidated by the other actors that surrounded him. "I’m in awe of good actors".

He appeared in the contemporary action-mystery film, Thunderheart (1992), playing Walter Crow Horse, a gruff, savvy local cop living on an Indian reservation. He was quick to sign up for the movie, stating "I love The Badlands. My agent said, ‘I got a film for you. It’s in South Dakota. And you have to ride a motorcycle.’ I said, ‘I’m in.’ ‘Want to read it?’ ‘Don’t have to'."

In 1994's Maverick, Greene elicited good reviews as the sidekick to Mel Gibson. At a screening of the movie the LA Times noted that Greene, "[as a] thoroughly modern Native American who exploits his position as a tourist attraction for Russian adventurers", got the most laughs. 

Greene also acted alongside Bruce Willis and Samuel L. Jackson in the 1995 film Die Hard with a Vengeance, where he played Detective Joe Lambert.

The Green Mile 
Greene was featured as Arlen Bitterbuck who was convicted of murder, awaiting execution on death row in the Oscar-nominated The Green Mile (1999). The character was an elder of the Washita Tribe and a member of a Cherokee Council, his nickname was "The Chief". The character's execution is the first witnessed in the movie, and is depicted from start to finish. As it is the first depiction of an execution in the movie, Greene's death is noted as being a fairly accurate portrayal of the procedure. 

Greene co-starred as Slick Nakai with Adam Beach and Wes Studi in the film A Thief of Time (2004) and Coyote Waits, both adapted from Tony Hillerman novels of the same names and produced by Robert Redford.

Transamerica 
In 2005, he played the potential love interest of the female lead in Transamerica. A review of the movie praises Greene's performance as having "charming earthiness" but also notes that his character is allowed to find the transgendered character attractive as "he's allowed to be open-minded because he's a Navajo -- in other words, a spiritually open-minded outsider, as opposed to your typical Middle American."

Greene worked with Aaron Sorkin on Molly's Game in 2017. In his role as a judge, the actor recalled "Aaron, the director, was looking at me sitting behind the bench. I had a puzzled look on my face. He said, ‘Are you all right?’ I said, ‘Yeah. I’ve just never seen the bench from this side before.’” 

Greene was cast in the Marvel movie spin-off Echo in 2022.

Other work 
Greene provided the pre-recorded narration for Tecumseh!, the highly acclaimed outdoor show held in Ohio, based upon the life of the illustrious Shawnee chief of that name. He portrayed Sitting Bull in a short Historica vignette.

In 2018, Greene provided the voice of the beleaguered Native-American elder Chief Rains Fall in the western-themed video game Red Dead Redemption 2.

Personal life 
Greene and his wife Hilary Blackmore live outside of Toronto with a "small army of cats". They were married in 1990, and have four children together. He enjoys writing, building boats and playing golf, noting "I just want to go and play, I don't care who's looking. It's a game where you get to play against yourself". He has stated that he has no interest in migrating south to California for roles. "There’s no reason to live there. A working actor can live anywhere as long as you have a phone, a fax, and know where the airport is." Regarding his time playing Mr. Crabby Tree (and the follow up role in the pre-teen show Eric's World) he noted "I spent a year paying penance doing kids’ shows." 

When discussing roles of native people, Greene noted that he would like to see depictions of "his people" as more than stoic, "My people are very funny".

In 1997, Greene suffered a major depressive episode, and had to be hospitalized after a police encounter. He recovered after help from Bruce Willis and Samuel L. Jackson. 

In June 2008, he was awarded an honorary doctor of law degree from the Brantford campus of Wilfrid Laurier University. 

He was named a Member of the Order of Canada in 2015.

Filmography

Film

Television

Video games

Awards and nominations

See also
 Notable Indigenous people of Canada

References

External links

 
 
 

1952 births
Canadian male film actors
Canadian male voice actors
Canadian male television actors
Dora Mavor Moore Award winners
First Nations male actors
Canadian Screen Award winners
Grammy Award winners
Living people
Oneida people
Male actors from Hamilton, Ontario
Male Western (genre) film actors
People from the County of Brant
Members of the Order of Canada
Indspire Awards
Audiobook narrators